Diocese of Agra is an Anglican diocese under the Church of North India. Diocese of Agra, within the Church of North India, was constituted by the decision of the Synod Executive of the Church of North India. The new Diocese thus formed comprising the western part of Uttar Pradesh was named the Diocese of Agra. The Diocese's constitution was accepted and adopted by Minutes 76/6 at the first ordinary meeting of the Diocesan Council of the Diocese of Agra which held its session in St. John's College, Agra Hall, on 9 April 1976.

The current bishop is Prem Prakash Habil.

The Constitution

The Constitution of the Diocese of Agra was accepted and adopted by minutes 76/6 at the first ordinary meeting of the Diocesan Council of the Diocese of Agra which held its sessions in St. John's College, Agra on 9 April 1976 and as subsequently amended up to the Sixteenth Diocesan Council held on 2–5 October 2006 at St. Paul's College, Agra.

Preamble 

As authorized by the Constitution and the Church of North India, the Agra Diocesan Council adopted its Constitution for the Pastorates, keeping in view the condition and needs of Pastorates in the Diocese, and the same was approved by the Church of North India Synod Executive Committee.

The Pastorate 

A Pastorate is an organized congregation or a group of Congregations, recognized as a Pastorate by the Diocesan Council, under the Pastoral care of the Presbyter-in-charge. In some pastorates other ministers may be appointed to assist the presbyter-in-charge of the pastorate and to work under his/her supervision.
The pastorate comprises the below mentioned
 The Presbyter-in-charge,
 Associate/Assistant Pastors and Deacons, if any, in the active service of the Church,
 The President or Secretary of the Pastorate W.F.C.S,
 The president or Secretary of the Pastorate Youth Fellowship,
 The Secretary/Superintendent of the Sunday School in the Pastorate shall be ex-officio member of the Pastorate Committee.
 Lay members to be elected on the Pastoral Committee by the Pastorate according to the following proportions:

Education
The Diocese has played a prominent role in promoting and providing sound education to our society. The Agra Diocese has played a prominent role in promoting and providing sound education to our society. It looks after the Schools and Education via the Diocesan Education Board, a Non-Profit organization with the objective to serve the Country through sound education based on Christian principles. The Diocesan Education Board is registered under Act No XXI/1860 of the Societies Act, Uttar Pradesh by Registrar of Societies, U.P Lucknow.
	
Under the Holy Supervision of the Bishop the Diocese is serving our society in Agra, Aligarh, Mathura, Meerut, Kanpur, Ghaziabad, Etah, Kasganj, Bareilly, Bulandshahar, Farukhabad, Moradabad, Sambhal, Mainpuri,Dehradun,Saharanpur,Mussoorie, Nainital and in all about forty such places in the western Uttar Pradesh and Uttarakhand Region. The Schools and Colleges are

St. John's College, Agra
St. George's College, Agra, Agra
St. Paul's College, Agra, Church Road, Civil Lines, Agra
St. Paul’s Church College Unit-II, M.G. Road, Agra
St. Paul’s Church College Unit-II, Sikandra Campus, Sikandra, Agra
Queen Victoria Girls Inter College, Hariparwat, Agra
Queen Victoria Nursery School, Delhi Gate, Agra
Queen Victoria English Medium School, Delhi Gate, Agra
Queen Victoria Primary School, Delhi Gate, Agra
SWM Higher Secondary School, Sikandra, Agra
St. John’s Girls Inter College, Agra
St. John’s Girls Primary School, M.G. Road, Agra
St. John’s Boys Inter College, Hospital Road, Agra
Diocesan Junior High School, Eng. Medium,
St. John’s Church Compound, Hospital Road, Agra
Christian Inter College, Mainpuri
Christian KG & Primary School, Mainpuri
Christian Agriculture Inter College, Etah
Prentiss Girls Inter College, Etah
St. John’s Church School, Etah
CNI Girls Inter College, 51-Rajpur Road, Dehradun
CNI Boys Inter College, Palton Bazar, Dehradun
Ferger Junior High School/Ferger Primary School, 51-Rajpur Road, Dehradun
St. John’s Primary School, 6-Kutchery Road. Dehradun
St. James Junior Highs School, Vikasnagar, Dehradun
Christ Church College, Kanpur
Christ Church Inter College, Kanpur
Epiphany Girls Junior High School, 14/137, Civil Lines, Kanpur
Bishop Westcott School, 16/104, Civil Lines, Kanpur
Rakha Girls inter College, Fatehgarh
Christian Inter College, Farrukhabad
City Girls Inter College, Farrukhabd
St. John’s Senior Secondary School, 117-Bank Street, Meerut Cantt
St. Thomas English Medium School, Jyoti Niketan, Chhipi Tank, Meerut
St. Thomas Girls’ Inter College, Meerut
St. Andrew’s Girls Junior High School, P.O. Jeyi, Meerut
St. Thomas Junior High School, Meerut
All Saints School, C/O St. Thomas Church Compound, Nili Kothi, Meerut
Holy Trinity Church School, Railway Station Road, Ghaziabad
St. Paul’s College, Moradabad
St. Perpetua’s Girls Junior High School, Pakbara, Moradabad
St. Andrew’s Boys Junior High School, Ummedpur, Moradabad
All Saints English Medium School, Delhi Road, Bulandshahr
Maishi Kanya Vidyalaya, Bulandshar
All Saints College, Nainital
Sherwood College, Nainital

References

External links
 Diocese of Agra - Church of North India, Official website

Church of North India
Anglican dioceses in Asia
Christianity in Uttar Pradesh
Agra